Miklós Dudás (born 16 April 1991) is a Hungarian sprint canoeist. At the 2012 Summer Olympics, he competed in the Men's K-1 200 metres.

In 2015, Dudás won a gold medal in the K-1 200 metres event at the 2015 European Games. He tested positive for a banned substance and he was disqualified from the event.

Awards and honours

Orders and special awards
  Cross of Merit of Hungary – Bronze Cross (2012)

References

Hungarian male canoeists
1991 births
Living people
Olympic canoeists of Hungary
Canoeists at the 2012 Summer Olympics
Canoeists at the 2015 European Games
European Games competitors for Hungary
ICF Canoe Sprint World Championships medalists in kayak
Doping cases in canoeing
Hungarian sportspeople in doping cases
21st-century Hungarian people